Viraj Suresh Bhosale (born 4 April 1992) is an Indian cricketer. He plays for Baroda cricket team. He made his first-class debut for Baroda in the 2016–17 Ranji Trophy on 7 December 2016 against Uttar Pradesh at Hutatma Anant Kanhere Maidan in Nashik.

References

External links
 

1992 births
Living people
Indian cricketers
Baroda cricketers
People from Vadodara
Wicket-keepers